The Puerto Rican leaf-toed gecko (Phyllodactylus wirshingi) is a species of lizard in the family Phyllodactylidae. The species is endemic to Puerto Rico.

Etymology
The specific name, wirshingi, is in honor of Puerto Rican amateur naturalist Juan A. "Tito" Wirshing (died 1967), who collected the holotype.

Geographic range
P. wirshingi is found on the Puerto Rican island of Caja de Muertos, and on the adjacent southern coast of Puerto Rico.

Habitat

Reproduction
P. wirshingi is oviparous.

References

Further reading
Kerster HW, Smith HM (1955). "The Identity of the Puerto Rican Species of Phyllodactylus (Reptilia: Squamata)".  Herpetologica 11 (3): 229–232. (Phyllodactylus wirshingi, new species).
Rösler H (2000). "Kommentierte Liste der rezent, subrezent und fossil bekannten Geckotaxa (Reptilia: Gekkonomorpha)". Gekkota 2: 28–153. (Phyllodactylus wirshingi, p. 105). (in German).
Schwartz A, Henderson RW (1991). Amphibians and Reptiles of the West Indies: Descriptions, Distributions, and Natural History. Gainesville: University of Florida Press. 720 pp. . (Phyllodactylus wirshingi, p. 461).
Schwartz A, Thomas R (1975). A Check-list of West Indian Amphibians and Reptiles. Carnegie Museum of Natural History Special Publication No. 1. Pittsburgh, Pennsylvania: Carnegie Museum of Natural History. 216 pp. (Phyllodactylus wirshingi, p. 142).
Weiss AJ, Hedges SB (2007). "Molecular phylogeny and biogeography of the Antillean geckos Phyllodactylus wirshingi, Tarentola americana, and Hemidactylus haitianus (Reptilia, Squamata)". Molecular Phylogenetics and Evolution 45 (1): 409–416.

Phyllodactylus
Reptiles of Puerto Rico
Reptiles described in 1955